Sutton Stracke (née Brown; born September 20, 1971) is an American socialite, businesswoman and television personality. She is known for appearing on The Real Housewives of Beverly Hills.

Early life 
Sutton Stracke (nee Sutton Brown) was born and raised in Augusta, Georgia, where her father was an architect in private practice and her mother was a social worker for the Veterans Administration. After graduating from Converse College, a women's college in South Carolina, she moved to New York City to study dance in her early 20s. She served as associate director of development in charge of fundraising for the Cunningham Dance Foundation in New York, and was the executive director of the Augusta Ballet.

Career 
Stracke first joined the cast of The Real Housewives of Beverly Hills in season 10 in a recurring capacity known as a “friend of the housewives”, but was later upgraded to a full-time cast member from the eleventh season onwards. She was once ranked as one of the top party hosts in America in a list. She owns a fashion boutique in West Hollywood.

Personal life 
Stracke married PIMCO’s Christian Stracke in 2000 and they divorced in 2016. They have three children together, two of whom have appeared on the show.

References

External links
 

1971 births
Living people
American socialites
American television personalities
People from Augusta, Georgia
The Real Housewives of Beverly Hills